Coleophora albicinctella is a moth of the family Coleophoridae. It is found in Spain.

References

albicinctella
Moths described in 1960
Moths of Europe